Pakleni trio (trans. Hell Trio) is the fourth studio album by Yugoslav rock band Gordi, released in 1981. Pakleni trio was the band's first album to feature heavy metal sound, for which Gordi are mostly remembered.

Background
Gordi started their career in the late 1970s, with their first three albums being progressive/hard rock oriented. After the band's third studio album, Gordi 3, keyboardist Goran Manojlović, brother of Gordi frontman and leader Zlatko Manojlović, left the band, Gordi continuing as a power trio. In 1981 the band released Pakleni trio. Heavily influenced by the new wave of British heavy metal, Pakleni trio marked a shift in the band's musical direction and is today considered a milestone on the Yugoslav heavy metal scene.

2006 reissue
Pakleni trio was rereleased by Rock Express Records in 2006. The album reissue featured two bonus tracks, "Duga noć" ("Long Night") and "Idi sad" ("Go Now"), from a 7-inch single Gordi released in 1978. The reissue also featured video recordings of the songs "Igraj, luduj", "Ona je žena" and "Tebi ne treba niko" from a 1982 concert by the band, as well as a video recording of Zlatko Manojlović's 2005 concert in Germany.

Track listing
All songs written by Zlatko Manojlović.

Personnel
Zlatko Manojlović – guitar, vocals, producer
Slobodan Svrdlan – bass guitar, vocals
Čedomir Petrović – drums, vocals

Additional personnel
Rade Ercegovac - recorded by
Jugoslav Vlahović - artwork, photography, graphic design
Boško Boroš - photography

Legacy
In 2021 the songs "Put do pakla", "Tebi ne treba niko" and "Igraj luduj" were ranked 25th, 74th and 80th respectively on the list of 100 Greatest Yugoslav Hard & Heavy Anthems by web magazine Balkanrock.

References 

Pakleni trio at Discogs

External links
Pakleni trio at Discogs

Gordi (band) albums
1982 albums
Jugoton albums